Theodore P. Gilman (1857 – 1922) was an American business executive and politician from New York.

Life
In 1894, he was arrested on a charge of fraud by selling stock of the Port Jervis Brewery of which he had been President, but was then already insolvent and in receivership.

From 1899 to 1900, he was First Deputy Comptroller. After the death of William J. Morgan in September 1900, Gilman was appointed as New York State Comptroller to fill the vacancy until the end of the year. In 1901, he was re-appointed as First Deputy Comptroller, and resigned the post on January 15, 1903, to become President of the General Electric Inspection Company.

He died in 1922.

Sources

External links
 

1857 births
New York State Comptrollers
Politicians from New York City
1922 deaths
New York (state) Republicans